Logan Austin (born 8 July 1995) is a former professional Australian rules footballer with the St Kilda Football Club in the Australian Football League (AFL). He previously played for the Port Adelaide Football Club from 2015 to 2017.

Originally from Canberra, he made his AFL debut in round 11 of the 2016 AFL season, playing in defence on recalled Collingwood forward Travis Cloke, and keeping him goalless for the game. At the conclusion of the 2017 AFL season, Austin was traded to St Kilda.

References

External links

 

Living people
1995 births
Belconnen Football Club players
Port Adelaide Football Club players
St Kilda Football Club players
Sandringham Football Club players
Port Adelaide Football Club players (all competitions)
Australian rules footballers from the Australian Capital Territory